Vacation (2007) is the first and most recent novel by American author Jeremy C. Shipp.  Vacation’s protagonist, Bernard Johnson, finds himself trapped in a job his parents chose for him, miserable in a loveless relationship, and dependent on anti-depressants for his emotional stability.  When he takes his Vacation, a year-long federally funded trip around the world provided to every American, he is kidnapped by terrorists but does not miss his average life or the expectations placed on him by society.

External links
Jeremy C. Shipp’s Official Website
Review of Vacation by Rick Kleffel
Interview with Jeremy C. Shipp in 3:AM Magazine
Vacation Page at Raw Dog Screaming Press
Author Bio at Raw Dog Screaming Press

2007 American novels
American science fiction novels
American horror novels
Novels by Jeremy C. Shipp